ADS Securities LLC is a private financial services firm headquartered in Abu Dhabi that offers online trading, investment, wealth management and asset management services for institutional, private and retail clients. It provides foreign investment markets analysis on CNBC, Bloomberg, and CNBC Arabiya.

Company

ADS Securities LLC (“ADSS”) is authorised and regulated by the Securities and Commodities Authority (“SCA”) in the United Arab Emirates as a trading broker for Over the Counter (“OTC”) Derivatives contracts and foreign exchange spot markets. ADSS is a limited liability company incorporated under United Arab Emirates law. The company is registered with the Department of Economic Development of Abu Dhabi (No. 1190047).

ADSS is the biggest foreign-exchange trader in the Middle East and North Africa (MENA) region and serves central banks, asset managers, brokerage firms, and hedge funds.

The firm was established with $400 million in capital under Abu Dhabi Chamber of Commerce and began trading in March 2011. In 2016, the shareholders increased their capital investment with an additional $185 million to increase the total capitalization to $585 million by end of year.

Services 
ADSS business areas include trading and brokerage based on its own multi-asset trading technology. The company also has a cross-asset investment service, investment banking division and it offers wealth and asset management services. The firm is known for its pricing of CFDs including a Dubai Oil CFD which gave Middle Eastern investors access to the local commodity for the first time. On 4 May 2016, the company announced the launch of an Arabic language trading application called OREX mobile.

Regional Offices 
ADSS is based in Abu Dhabi and has two regional offices:

 ADSS London (ADS Securities London Limited) is authorized and regulated in the UK by the Financial Conduct Authority (FRN 577453) and is an IFPRU 730K firm, with its registered office at 9th Floor, 125 Old Broad Street, London, EC2N 1AR, registration number: 07785265.
 ADSS Hong Kong (ADS Securities Hong Kong Limited) is licensed by the Hong Kong Securities and Futures Commission (CE No. AXC847) to act as a financial intermediary in the conduct of brokerage business for the sale and purchase of securities, futures contract, leveraged foreign exchange and advising on corporate finance as permitted in accordance with the Securities and Futures Ordinance of Hong Kong. ADSS Hong Kong holds SFC type, 1, 2, 3, 4 and 6 licenses.

Another wholly owned subsidiary of ADSS Group is ADS Investment Solutions.

References

External links 

Securities (finance)
Companies based in Abu Dhabi
2011 establishments in the United Arab Emirates
Companies established in 2011
Financial services companies established in 2011
Financial services companies of the United Arab Emirates